Eupithecia claudei is a moth in the family Geometridae. It is found in Nepal.

The wingspan is about 18 mm. The fore- and hindwings are light brown and pale yellow.

References

Moths described in 2010
claudei
Moths of Asia